Tina Vallès (born in Barcelona in 1976) is a Catalan writer, proofreader and translator.

She graduated in Catalan Philology at the University of Barcelona in 1999. She has worked as a proofreader for several publishing houses in the Catalonia. He has translated several works from Spanish to Catalan, and has written several books of fiction, including El parèntesi més llarg (The Longest Parenthesis), with which he won the Mercè Rodoreda Award.

She has been the co-editor of the literary magazine Paper de Vidre since 2006 and a founding member of the Professional Association of Translators and Interpreters of Catalonia. In 2017 she won the Anagrama Prize for novels with La memòria de l'arbre (The Memory of the Tree), a book that has been translated into 14 languages: Spanish, Italian, French, Portuguese, Galician, Turkish, Arabic, German, Polish, Lithuanian, Brazilian, Slovenian, Russian and Czech.

Works 

 L'aeroplà del Raval. Barcelona: LaBreu (2006)
 El caganer més divertit de Nadal en 3D. Barcelona: Estrella Polar (2011)
 Petita història: Palau Güell. Barcelona: Mediterrània (2011)
 Maic. Barcelona: Baula (2011)
 Un altre got d'absenta. Barcelona: LaBreu (2012)
 El parèntesi més llarg. Barcelona: Proa (2013)
 La cigala i la formiga. Barcelona: Estrella Polar (2016)
 La llebre i la tortuga. Barcelona: Estrella Polar (2016)
 Bocabava. Il·lustracions de Gabriel Salvadó. Barcelona: Fragmenta (2016) ISBN 978-84-15518-39-6.
 Totes les pors. Barcelona: La Galera (2016)
 La marieta sense taques. Barcelona: Bambú (2017)
 La memòria de l'arbre. Barcelona: Anagrama (2017)
 Crec. Amb il·lustracions d'Alicia Baladan. Barcelona: Kireei (2017)
 Erra. Barcelona: Comanegra (2018)
 Els pòstits del senyor Nohisoc. Illustrated by Christian Inaraja. La Galera (2021) 
 El senyor Palomar a Barcelona. Barcelona: Anagrama (2021)
 Mira. Il·lustracions de Mercè Galí. Barcelona: Animallibres (2021)

Awards 
 Mercè Rodoreda Prize for El parèntesi més llarg (2012)
 Anagrama award for La memòria de l'arbre (2017)
 Maria Àngels Anglada Prize for La memòria de l'arbre (2018)
 Prix Jean Monnet des Jeunes Européens for the french version of La memòria de l'arbre, translated by Juliette Lemerle. Philippe Rey Editors, (2020)
 Folch i Torres award for Els pòstits del senyor Nohisoc (2020)

References 

Women writers from Catalonia
Novelists from Catalonia

1976 births
Living people
Catalan-language writers